The 2014–15 Copa Argentina was the sixth edition of the Copa Argentina, and the fourth since the relaunch of the tournament in 2011. The competition began on October 15, 2014. Defending champions Huracán were eliminated by Independiente Rivadavia in the Round of 64. In the final, Boca Juniors won the tournament beating Rosario Central to win their third title. By winning the competition, Boca Juniors won the right to play the 2015 Supercopa Argentina, and Rosario Central, as runner-up won the right to play in the 2016 Copa Libertadores because Boca Juniors had already qualified as Primera División champion.

Teams 
Two hundred and seventy teams took part in this competition. All the teams from the Primera División (20), Primera B Nacional (22), Primera B Metropolitana (22), Federal A (40), Primera C (20), Federal B (128), and Primera D (18).

First Level

Primera División 

  Arsenal
  Atlético de Rafaela
  Banfield
  Belgrano
  Boca Juniors
  Defensa y Justicia
  Estudiantes (LP)
  Gimnasia y Esgrima (LP)
  Godoy Cruz
  Independiente
  Lanús
  Newell's Old Boys
  Olimpo
  Quilmes
  Racing Club
  River Plate
  Rosario Central
  San Lorenzo
  Tigre
  Vélez Sársfield

Second Level

Primera B Nacional 

  Aldosivi
  All Boys
  Argentinos Juniors
  Atlético Tucumán
  Boca Unidos
  Colón
  Crucero del Norte
  Douglas Haig
  Ferro Carril Oeste
  Gimnasia y Esgrima (J)
  Guaraní Antonio Franco
  Huracán (defending champions)
  Independiente Rivadavia
  Instituto
  Nueva Chicago
  Patronato
  Ramon Santamarina
  San Martín (SJ)
  Sarmiento (J)
  Sportivo Belgrano
  Temperley
  Unión

Third Level

Primera B Metropolitana 

  Acassuso
  Almagro
  Almirante Brown
  Atlanta
  Barracas Central
  Brown
  Chacarita Juniors
  Colegiales
  Comunicaciones
  Deportivo Armenio
  Deportivo Español
  Deportivo Merlo
  Deportivo Morón
  Estudiantes (BA)
  Fénix
  Los Andes
  Platense
  Sportivo Italiano
  Tristán Suárez
  UAI Urquiza
  Villa Dálmine
  Villa San Carlos

Torneo Federal A 

  Alianza de Cutral Có
  Altos Hornos Zapla
  Alvarado (MdP)
  Américo Tesorieri (LR)
  Andino (La Rioja)
  Atlético Paraná
  CAI
  Chaco For Ever
  Central Córdoba (SdE)
  Cipolletti
  Defensores de Belgrano (VR)
  Deportivo Madryn
  Deportivo Maipú
  Deportivo Roca
  Ferro Carril Oeste (GP)
  General Belgrano
  Gimnasia y Esgrima (CdU)
  Gimnasia y Esgrima (Mza)
  Gimnasia y Tiro (S)
  Guillermo Brown
  Independiente (C)
  Independiente (N)
  Juventud Antoniana (S)
  Juventud Unida (G)
  Juventud Unida Universitario
  Libertad (S)
  Mitre (SdE)
  San Jorge (T)
  San Lorenzo de Alem
  San Martín (T)
  Sarmiento (R)
  Sol de América (F)
  Sportivo Estudiantes (SL)
  Sportivo Patria (F)
  Talleres (C)
  Textil Mandiyú (C)
  Tiro Federal (R)
  Unión Aconquija
  Unión (MdP)
  Unión (VK)

Fourth Level

Primera C Metropolitana 

  Argentino (M)
  Argentino (Q)
  Berazategui
  Central Córdoba (R)
  Defensores de Belgrano
  Defensores de Cambaceres
  Defensores Unidos
  Deportivo Riestra
  Laferrere
  Dock Sud
  Excursionistas
  Ferrocarril Midland
  Flandria
  General Lamadrid
  J. J. de Urquiza
  Juventud Unida (SM)
  Luján
  Sacachispas
  San Telmo
  Talleres (RdE)

Torneo Federal B 

  9 de Julio (M)
 9 de Julio (R)
  25 de Mayo (LP)
  Alianza de Moldes
  Almirante Brown (L)
  Alumni (VM)
  Atlético Amalia
  América (GP)
  Agropecuario Argentino
  Aprendices Casildenses
  Argentino Peñarol
  Argentinos (VdM)
  Atenas de Pocito
  Atenas (RC)
  Atlético Argentino (M)
  Atlético Camioneros
  Atlético Chicoana
  Atlético Concepción
  Atlético Palmira
  Atlético Pellegrini
  Atlético Policial
  Atlético Regina
  Bella Vista (BB)
  Bella Vista (T)
  Belgrano (E)
  Belgrano (P)
  Ben Hur
  Boxing Club
  Bragado Club
  Camioneros Argentinos del Norte
  Central Norte (S)
  Colegiales (C)
  Colón Juniors
  Comercio (SS)
  Comercio Central Unidos
  Concepción FC
  Cruz del Sur
  Defensores (Pronunciamiento)
  Defensores de Salto
  Defensores (VdM)
  Deportivo Achirense
  Deportivo Aguilares
  Deportivo Fontana
  Deportivo Guaymallén
  Deportivo Lastenia
  Deportivo Tabacal
  Desamparados (SJ)
  El Linqueño
  Empleados de Comercio
  Estudiantes (RC)
  Everton
  Ex Alumnos Escuela N°185
  Ferrocarril Roca (LF)
  Ferro (O)
  Ferroviario (C)
  General Paz Juniors
  General Rojo
  Germinal
  Güemes (SdE)
  Gutiérrez
  Herminio Arrieta
  Huracán (G)
  Huracán (SR)
  Huracán Las Heras
  Independiente (Fe)
  Independiente (Fo)
  Independiente (HY)
  Independiente (RC)
  Independiente de Villa Obrera
  Instituto Santiago
  Jorge Gibson Brown
  Jorge Newbery (J)
  Jorge Newbery (VM)
  Juventud (P)
  Juventud Alianza
  Juventud Unida (C)
  Kimberley
  La Emilia
  Las Palmas
  La Salle Jobson
  Libertad (C)
  Liniers (BB)
  Luján SC
  Maronese
  Mitre (S)
  Monterrico San Vicente
  Ocampo Fábrica
  Once Tigres
  Pacífico
  Petrolero Argentino
  Progreso (RdlF)
  Puerto General San Martín
  Racing (C)
  Racing (O)
  Resistencia Central
  Río Grande
  Rivadavia (L)
  San Carlos (LE)
  San Jorge (SF)
  San Martín (M)
  Sanjustino
  Sarmiento (A)
  Sarmiento (CS)
  Sarmiento (L)
  Sarmiento (LB)
  Social Obrero
  Sol de Mayo
  Sportivo (PRSP)
  Sportivo Atlético Ballofet
  Sportivo Baradero
  Sportivo Del Bono
  Sportivo Las Parejas
  Sportivo Peñarol (Ch)
  Sportivo Rivadavia (VT)
  Sportivo Tintina
  Sports de Salto
  Talleres (F)
  Talleres (P)
  Tiro Federal (BB)
  Tiro Federal (M)
  Tiro y Gimnasia
  Trinidad de San Juan
  Unión (S)
  Unión Santiago
  Vélez Sársfield (SR)
  Viale Foot-Ball Club
  Villa Cubas (C)
  Villa Mitre

Fifth Level

Primera D Metropolitana 

  Argentino (R)
  Atlas
  Atlético Lugano
  Cañuelas
  Central Ballester
  Centro Español
  Claypole
  Deportivo Muñiz
  El Porvenir
  Ituzaingó
  Leandro N. Alem
  Liniers
  Puerto Nuevo
  San Martín (B)
  San Miguel
  Sportivo Barracas
  Victoriano Arenas
  Yupanqui

Regional Round 

This round is organized by the Consejo Federal.

Group A:Federal A

Round I 

In this first round, 40 teams from the Torneo Federal A and 4 teams from the Torneo Federal B participated. The round was played on October 22, in a single match knock-out format. The 22 winning teams advanced to the Round II.

Round II 

In this round, 22 teams qualified from Round I participated. The round was played between November 5 and November 21, in a single knock-out match format. The 11 winning teams advanced to the Final Stage.

Group B:Federal B

Round I 

In this first round, 72 teams from the Torneo Argentino B participated. The round was played between October 15 and October 22, in a single match knock-out format. The 36 winning teams advanced to the Round II.

Round II 

In this round, 36 qualified teams from the Round I and the remaining 52 teams from Torneo Federal B participated. The round was played between October 29 and November 12, in a single knock-out match format. The 44 winning teams advanced to the Round III.

Round III 

In this round, 44 qualified teams from the Round II participated. The round was played between November 12 and November 19, in a single knock-out match format. The 22 winning teams advanced to the Round IV.

Round IV 

In this round, 22 qualified teams from the Round III participated. The round was played between November 26 and November 27, in a single knock-out match format. The 11 winning teams advanced to the Final Stage.

Regional Final Stage 

In this round, 11 qualified teams from the Round II of Group A and 11 qualified teams from the Round IV of Group B. The round was played between December 4 and February 22, in a single knock-out match format. The 11 winning teams advanced to the Final Round.

Metropolitan Round 

This round is organized directly by the AFA.

Group 1

Round I 

In this first round, 18 teams from the Primera D and 14 from the Primera C participated. The round was played between November 22 and February 9, in a single match knock-out format. The 16 winning teams advanced to the Round II.

Round II 
In this round, 16 qualified teams from the Round I and the 6 remaining teams from Primera C participated. The round was played between February 25 and March 20, in a single match knock-out format. The 11 winning teams advanced to the Metropolitan Final Stage.

Group 2

Round I 

In this first round, 22 teams from the Primera B participated. The round was played between November 22 and February 8, in a single match knock-out format. The 11 winning teams advanced to Metropolitan Final Stage.

Metropolitan Final Stage 

In this round, 11 qualified teams from the Round II of Group 1 and 11 qualified teams from the Round I of Group 2 participated. The round was played between March 25 and April 8, in a single knock-out match format. The 11 winning teams advanced to the Final Round.

Final round

Bracket

Upper bracket

Lower bracket

Round of 64 

This round will have 11 qualified teams from the Regional Round, 11 qualified teams from the Metropolitana Round, 22 teams from Primera B Nacional and 20 teams from Primera División. The round was played between March 18 and July 1, in a single knock-out match format. The 32 winning teams advanced to the Round of 32. The draw took place on 10 February 2015.

Round of 32 

This round will have the 32 qualified teams from the Round of 64. The round was played between July 3 and August 12, in a single knock-out match format. The 16 winning teams advanced to the Round of 16.

Round of 16 

This round will have the 16 qualified teams from the Round of 32. The round was played between August 19 and September 3, in a single knock-out match format. The 8 winning teams advanced to the Quarterfinals.

Quarterfinals 

This round will have the 8 qualified teams from the Round of 16. The round was played between September 9 and September 23, in a single knock-out match format. The 4 winning teams advanced to the Semifinals.

Semifinals 

This round will have the 4 qualified teams from the Quarterfinals. The round was played on October 23, in a single knock-out match format. The 2 winning teams advanced to the Final.

Final

Top goalscorers 

Note: Players in bold are still active in the competition.

References

External links 
 Official site 
 Copa Argentina on the Argentine Football Association's website 

2015
Argentina
2015 in Argentine football
2014 in Argentine football